Mangbai (Mamgbay, Mambai) is an Mbum language of northern Cameroon and southern Chad.

Distribution
In Cameroon, Mambay is spoken along the Mayo-Kebi River near the Chadian border, in the Djaloumé region (northern end of Bibemi commune, Bénoué department), where there is a massif called Hosséré Mambay. It is also spoken in the extreme southeast of Figuil commune, Mayo-Louti department. In Cameroon and Chad, there is a total of about 2,500 speakers, many of whom also speak Mundang.

References

Languages of Chad
Languages of Cameroon
Mbum languages